Alambari is a Brazilian municipality located in the state of São Paulo. It is part of the Metropolitan Region of Sorocaba. The population is 6,129 (2020 est.) in an area of 159.60 km². The municipality was established in 1993.

References

Municipalities in São Paulo (state)
Populated places established in 1993